Texas Southern Tigers football players have been drafted in the NFL Draft.

Key

Selections

References

Texas Southern

Texas Southern Tigers in the NFL Draft
Texas Southern Tigers in the NFL Draft